Main (A515) is the fifth ship of the s of the German Navy.

Development 

The Elbe-class replenishment ships are also known tenders of the German Navy. In German, this type of ship is called Versorgungsschiffe which can be translated as "supply ship" though the official translation in English is "replenishment ship". 

They are intended to support German naval units away from their home ports. The ships carry fuel, provisions, ammunition and other matériel and also provide medical services. The ships are named after German rivers where German parliaments were placed.

Construction and career 
Main was launched in June 1993 in Bremen-Vegesack, Germany. She was commissioned on 10 June 1994.

Main returned to her home port in Eckernförde on 13 April 2017. In addition to their own on-board crew, doctors, military police, language mediators and an Austrian boarding team were also embarked, so that the crew comprised around 105 women and men.

Gallery

References

External links 

Elbe-class replenishment ships
1993 ships
Ships built in Bremen (state)